Ariane de Rothschild (née Langner; 14 November 1965) is a French banker, president of the board of the Edmond de Rothschild Group since April 2019. She is the first woman to run a Rothschild-branded financial institution.

She was married to Benjamin de Rothschild from 23 January 1999 until his death on 15 January 2021. They have four daughters.

In 2022, the net worth of Ariane de Rothschild and her family was estimated at 5 billion euros by French weekly business magazine Challenges.

Family 

Ariane de Rothschild was born in San Salvador, El Salvador. Her father was a senior executive at the international pharmaceutical company Hoechst. Until the age of eighteen, Ariane de Rothschild and her brother Philippe lived with their parents in Bangladesh, Colombia and the former Zaire (DRC).

In January 1999, she married Benjamin de Rothschild, son of Edmond de Rothschild and heir of the Edmond de Rothschild Group. They have 4 daughters. Her husband Benjamin de Rothschild died on 15 January 2021 of a heart attack. Ariane de Rothschild is not Jewish and did not convert to Judaism.

Education
Ariane de Rothschild attended the French lycée in Zaire, studied at Sciences Po in Paris  and holds an MBA in financial management from Pace University in New York, where she studied from 1988 to 1990.

Career 

While studying at Pace, Ariane de Rothschild was a broker at Société Générale in New York City. After graduating in 1990, she joined AIG’s New York offices, and relocated to AIG's trading floor in Paris the same year. She met Benjamin de Rothschild, a client of AIG, in 1993.

After marrying Benjamin de Rothschild in 1999, Ariane de Rothschild joined the family business La Compagnie Financière Edmond de Rothschild (LCF) by taking on the management of the group's lifestyle assets (wineries, farms, hotels, restaurants). In 2005, she restructured the group's philanthropic activities with the intent to develop a sustainable "return on engagement" philanthropic model, which led to the creation of the Edmond de Rothschild Foundations, a structure active in five different fields : Art and culture, health and research, philanthropy, cultural dialogue and social entrepreneurship.

In 2006, she joined the supervisory board of LCF Edmond de Rothschild. In 2008, she was appointed board member of the group, and vice-president in 2009. She focused her agenda on environmental and social impact investments, and on restructuring the company's scattered assets and subsidiaries. In 2010, LCF Edmond de Rothschild changed its name to Edmond de Rothschild Group. In 2014, all of the group's financial and non-financial assets were reorganized within the group's structure. In 2015, the group published a sustainability report for the first time.

On 30 January 2015, Ariane de Rothschild became the president of the executive committee, overseeing the group's operations. She was nominated to give a new impetus to the company. She brought a self-proclaimed "panache" to the spirit of the bank, sparking innovation within the group's executive lines  and breaking the ice in the banking industry with a new leadership style.

In 2016, she finalized the reorganization of the group's lifestyle assets under the new label Edmond de Rothschild Heritage. She pulled the Edmond de Rothschild Group out of Asia and, the following year, in 2017, she implemented the Avaloq banking technology. In March 2019, the company removed Edmond de Rothschild (Switzerland) S.A. from public trading, making it entirely held by the group. Ariane de Rothschild became chairman of the board. The French business was folded into the Swiss company to simplify the structure of the group. In January 2021, her husband Benjamin de Rothschild died, making her the sole majority owner of the Edmond de Rothschild Group, holding the majority of the votes with her four daughters.

Other activities
From 2003 to 2011, the Ariane de Rothschild Art Prize awarded contemporary art initiatives. The Ariane de Rothschild Women's Doctoral Program in Israel was launched in 2009 to provide full financial support and enhanced educational programs to women pursuing a doctoral program. The following year, in 2010, the Ariane de Rothschild Fellowship Program was launched to foster intercultural dialogue through social entrepreneurship and social science, especially between the Jewish and Muslim communities.

In 2012, she talked with Warren Buffett about philanthropy in the first scene of the documentary The Billionaires' Pledge.

In 2018, she led the acquisition of the fragrance company Parfums Caron and managed the revival of the brand. After the death of husband Benjamin de Rothschild in 2021, she took over the management of the sailing stable Gitana Team. In 2021, she released the first vintage of the rosé wine L'Amistà (Château Roubine, Côtes de Provence) she co-developed.

Distinctions 

 2022: Swiss Finance's Women To Watch

See also 

 Edmond de Rothschild Group
 Benjamin de Rothschild
 Rothschild family

Further reading

References

External links
Edmond de Rothschild Group website
AdR Fellowship website

1965 births
Living people
French baronesses
French humanitarians
Women humanitarians
French bankers
French philanthropists
21st-century French businesswomen
21st-century French businesspeople
French viticulturists
Women corporate directors
Pace University alumni
People from San Salvador
Rothschild family